The Guinean killifish (Archiaphyosemion guineense) is a species of African rivuline killifish from the family Nothobranchiidae native to the African nations of Guinea, Liberia, and Sierra Leone, where it is found in savanna streams and pools. It is found in the aquarium trade, where it has a reputation as being a difficult fish to keep.

References

Nothobranchiidae
Monotypic fish genera
Freshwater fish of West Africa
Guinean killifish